Savonlinna is a town and a municipality of  inhabitants in the southeast of Finland, in the heart of the Saimaa lake region, which is why the city is also nicknamed the "Capital of Saimaa". Together with Mikkeli, it is one of the largest towns in the South Savonia region and one of the concentrations in the region's hospital districts. The town is internationally known for its medieval St. Olaf's Castle and the annual Savonlinna Opera Festival. Its surrounding the enclaved municipality of Enonkoski.

History 

The city was founded in 1639, based on Olavinlinna castle (St. Olaf's Castle). The castle was founded by Erik Axelsson Tott in 1475 in an effort to protect Savonia and to control the unstable border between the Kingdom of Sweden and its Russian adversary. During the Russo-Swedish War (1741–1743), the castle was captured by Field-Marshal Peter Lacy. It was held by Russia between 1743 and 1812, when it was granted back to Finland as a part of "Old Finland".

In 1973 the municipality of Sääminki was consolidated with Savonlinna. In the beginning of year 2009 the municipality of Savonranta and a  land strip from Enonkoski between Savonlinna and Savonranta were consolidated with Savonlinna. In the beginning of the year 2013, the municipalities of Kerimäki and Punkaharju were consolidated with Savonlinna.

Attractions 
The most notable attraction in Savonlinna is the Olavinlinna castle, a 15th-century castle built on an island. Near the castle is also the Savonlinna regional museum. Some other attractions include the forest museum Lusto in the village of Punkaharju, and the Kerimäki Church in the neighboring village of Kerimäki, which is the largest wooden church in the world.

Savonlinna hosts the famous annual Savonlinna Opera Festival, which was held first time in 1912. The operas are performed on a stage built inside the Olavinlinna castle. The city has also hosted the Mobile Phone Throwing World Championships since 2000.

Sports
The ice hockey team of Savonlinna, SaPKo or Savonlinnan Pallokerho, is playing in the second tier Mestis.

The top-tier volleyball team Saimaa Volley plays some of its home matches in Savonlinna. The football team Savonlinnan Työväen Palloseura (STPS), is playing in Kolmonen, the fourth tier.

Transport 

It is also  from the capital city of Helsinki by road, and some four hours away by train. Flights from Savonlinna Airport to Helsinki take 40–60 minutes.

Education 

South-Eastern Finland University of Applied Sciences has a campus in Savonlinna, teaching healthcare as well as process technologies. Research and development facilities include laboratories for wood processing and electronics. University of Eastern Finland had a campus in Savonlinna, primarily for teacher education. The campus  was shut down in 2018.

There are two high schools in Savonlinna. One of these high schools is specialized in art subjects, which when it started its operation in 1967 was the first specialized high school in Finland as well as in all of the Nordic countries.

International relations

Twin towns — Sister cities
Savonlinna is twinned with:

  Detmold, Germany
  Kalmar, Sweden  
  Torzhok, Russia

In addition, there is non-governmental cooperation with the following cities:
  Árborg, Iceland  
  Arendal, Norway
  Silkeborg, Denmark

Notable people 

 Hannu Aravirta, former professional hockey forward, coach for the Finnish national men's team, SM-liiga and Elitserien
 Arto Heiskanen, professional hockey left winger
 Kari Hietalahti, actor
 Ere Kokkonen, film director and screenwriter
 Hanna Kosonen, politician and ski-orienteer
 Erik Laxmann, explorer and natural scientist 
 Ville Leino, former professional hockey forward
 Petri Matikainen, ice hockey coach
 Jarmo Myllys, former professional hockey goaltender, member of the 1988, 1994 and 1998 Finnish Olympic ice hockey teams
 Pasha Pozdniakova, Finnish-Russian Playboy model and social media influencer
 Joonas Rask, professional hockey forward for HIFK
 Tuukka Rask, former professional hockey goaltender, member of the 2014 Finnish Olympic ice hockey team
 Heikki Silvennoinen, actor and musician
 Pekka Tirkkonen, ice hockey coach

See also 
 Enonkoski
 St. Olaf's Castle
 Savonia (historical province)
 Savonlinna Opera Festival

References

External links

Town of Savonlinna – Official site
Visit Savonlinna official tourism site

World66 – Open source travel guide
Map of Savonlinna

 
Populated lakeshore places in Finland
Cities and towns in Finland
Inland port cities and towns in Finland
Grand Duchy of Finland
1639 establishments in Sweden
Populated places established in 1639